Austin Daniel Pruitt (born August 31, 1989) is an American professional baseball pitcher in the Oakland Athletics organization. He has previously played in Major League Baseball (MLB) for the Tampa Bay Rays, Houston Astros, and Miami Marlins.

Career

Amateur career
Pruitt attended The Woodlands College Park High School in The Woodlands, Texas, where he was a four-year baseball letterer and two-year football letterer, starting at defensive back on the football team. He played college baseball at Navarro College and was considered a standout junior college baseball player. He transferred to the University of Houston.

Tampa Bay Rays
The Tampa Bay Rays selected Pruitt in the ninth round of the 2013 Major League Baseball draft. After signing, he made his professional debut with the Hudson Valley Renegades and was promoted to the Bowling Green Hot Rods in July. In 14 games (seven starts), he was 0–3 with a 1.44 ERA. In 2014, he pitched for the Charlotte Stone Crabs where he pitched to a 9–7 record with a 3.73 ERA in 26 games (25 starts), and in 2015, he played with the Montgomery Biscuits where he was 10–7 with a 3.09 ERA in 26 starts. He spent 2016 with the Durham Bulls where he compiled an 8–11 record with a 3.76 ERA in 28 starts. The Rays added Pruitt to their 40-man roster after the 2016 season. 

On March 30, 2017, the Tampa Bay Rays announced that Pruitt had made the 2017 Opening Day roster as a reliever. He made his major league debut on April 2, 2017. He loaded the bases and was charged with an unearned run without recording an out. Pruitt allowed ten earned runs in his first six innings of big league work. On 9 May, Pruitt was optioned to Durham after surrendering three runs the previous night. He was recalled on 31 May to replace Chih-Wei Hu. On July 28, Pruitt entered the Rays' rotation following an injury to starter Jake Odorizzi. In just his third career start, Pruitt hurled  scoreless innings against his hometown team — the Houston Astros. Pruitt ended the season with Tampa Bay with an ERA of 5.31 in  innings pitched, including eight starts. In 2018, Pruitt spent the majority of the season as the Rays' long reliever, logging  innings in 23 games. Pruitt appeared in 14 games for the Rays in 2019, recording a 4.40 ERA with 39 strikeouts in 47 innings.

Houston Astros
On January 9, 2020, the Rays traded Pruitt to the Houston Astros in exchange for Cal Stevenson and Peyton Battenfield. Pruitt did not appear in a game for the Astros in 2020 after suffering a hairline fracture in his right elbow. On April 10, 2021, Pruitt was placed on the 60-day injured list as he recovered from right elbow surgery. On July 16, Pruitt was activated off of the injured list. On July 28, Pruitt was designated for assignment by the Astros.

Miami Marlins 
On July 28, 2021, the Astros traded Pruitt along with minor league outfielder Bryan De La Cruz for relief pitcher Yimi García.
On August 5, the Marlins designated Pruitt for assignment. On August 7, Pruitt cleared waivers and was assigned outright to the Triple-A Jacksonville Jumbo Shrimp. On August 20, Pruitt's contract was selected by the Marlins. In 4 appearances for the Marlins, Pruitt posted a 1.93 ERA with 4 strikeouts. On September 2, Pruitt was designated for assignment by the Marlins, and was again outrighted to Jacksonville on September 5. On October 5, Pruitt elected free agency.

Oakland Athletics
On March 13, 2022, Pruitt signed a minor league contract with the Oakland Athletics. He had his contract selected to the major league roster on May 28, 2022. He was designated for assignment on August 22, 2022 and was sent outright to Triple-A Las Vegas. He re-signed a minor league contract on January 15, 2023.

References

External links

1989 births
Living people
People from The Woodlands, Texas
Baseball players from Texas
Major League Baseball pitchers
Sportspeople from Harris County, Texas
Tampa Bay Rays players
Houston Astros players
Miami Marlins players
Oakland Athletics players
Navarro Bulldogs baseball players
Houston Cougars baseball players
Hudson Valley Renegades players
Bowling Green Hot Rods players
Charlotte Stone Crabs players
Montgomery Biscuits players
Durham Bulls players
Fayetteville Woodpeckers players
Sugar Land Skeeters players
Jacksonville Jumbo Shrimp players